Khwārezmian (Khwarezmian: , zβ'k 'y xw'rzm; also transliterated Khwarazmian, Chorasmian, Khorezmian) is an extinct East Iranian language closely related to Sogdian. The language was spoken in the area of Khwarezm (Chorasmia), centered in the lower Amu Darya south of the Aral Sea (the northern part of the modern Republic of Uzbekistan and the adjacent areas of Kazakhstan and Turkmenistan).

Knowledge of Khwarezmian is limited to its Middle Iranian stage and, as with Sogdian, little is known of its ancient form. Based on the writings of Khwarezmian scholars Al-Biruni and Zamakhshari, the language was in use at least until the 13th century, when it was gradually replaced by Persian for the most part, as well as several dialects of Turkic.

Sources of Khwarezmian include astronomical terms used by al-Biruni, Zamakhshari's Arabic–Persian–Khwarezmian dictionary and several legal texts that use Khwarezmian terms and quotations to explain certain legal concepts, most notably the Qunyat al-Munya of Mukhtār al-Zāhidī al-Ghazmīnī (d. 1259/60).

The noted scholar W.B. Henning was preparing a dictionary of Khwarezmian when he died, leaving it unfinished. A fragment of this dictionary was published posthumously by D.N. MacKenzie in 1971.

Writing system

Before the advance of Islam in Transoxiana (early 8th century), Khwarezmian was written in a script close to that of Sogdian and Pahlavi with its roots in the imperial Aramaic script. From the few surviving examples of this script on coins and artifacts, it has been observed that written Khwarezmian included Aramaic logograms or ideograms, that is Aramaic words written to represent native spoken ones e.g.
𐡔𐡍𐡕 (ŠNT) for سرذ, sarδ, "year", 𐡍𐡐𐡔𐡉 (NPŠY) for خداك, xudāk, "self" and 𐡌𐡋𐡊𐡀 (MLK') for اى شاه, ī šah, "the king".

After the advance of Islam, Khwarezmian was written using an adapted version of the Perso-Arabic alphabet with a few extra signs to reflect specific Khwarezmian sounds, such as the letter څ which represents /ts/ and /dz/, as in the traditional Pashto orthography.

Unicode

Khwarezmian script was added to the Unicode Standard in March, 2020 with the release of version 13.0.

The Unicode block for Khwarezmian, called Chorasmian, is U+10FB0–U+10FDF:

See also

Afrighids
al-Khwārizmī
Ancient Iranian peoples
Al-Biruni
Central Asia
Iranian peoples
Iranian languages
Khwarezm
Zoroastrianism
Zamakhshari

Notes

Literature

The Khwarezmian Glossary
 .
 .
 .
 .
 .

Further reading
 .
 .

External links
Encyclopedia Iranica, "The Chorasmian language" by D.N. Mackenzie
https://web.archive.org/web/20040201160726/http://iranianlanguages.com/
https://web.archive.org/web/20041009124244/http://www.iranologie.com/history/ilf.html

Medieval languages
Eastern Iranian languages
Extinct languages of Asia
Languages attested from the 2nd century BC
Languages attested from the 1st millennium
Languages extinct in the 11th century